Gustavo Henrique Furtado Scarpa (born 5 January 1994) is a Brazilian professional footballer who plays as an attacking midfielder for Premier League club Nottingham Forest.

Club career

Fluminense
Scarpa was born in Hortolândia, São Paulo, and played for Guarani, Santos, Paulínia, and Desportivo Brasil before joining Fluminense in 2012. He made his first-team – and Série A – debut on 1 June 2014, coming on as a late substitute for Rafael Sóbis in a 1–1 home draw against Internacional.

Red Bull Brasil loan
Scarpa was rarely used during the season, and was loaned to Red Bull Brasil on 22 December 2014. He scored his first senior goal for the latter side the following 11 February, netting his team's first in a 3–2 Campeonato Paulista away win against Bragantino; ten days later he added a further goal, scoring in a 2–2 home draw against São Bento.

Breakthrough
After featuring regularly, Scarpa returned to Flu in May 2015. He started to feature more regularly for the first team, which was managed by Enderson Moreira, often appearing as a left back. He scored his first Série A goal on 9 July, netting the game's only in a home success over Cruzeiro.

On 28 September 2015, Scarpa renewed his contract until 2019, and finished the year as an undisputed starter. A mainstay in Fluminense's starting eleven during the 2016 campaign, he scored eight goals in the year's Brasileirão; highlights included a double in a 2–2 away draw against Internacional.

Scarpa started the 2017 season with four goals in six appearances, netting consecutive goals against Resende (1–0 home win), Portuguesa-RJ (3–0 away win), Bangu (4–0 home win) and Globo (5–2 away win); the latter came from the halfway line. On 25 February, in a 0–0 home draw against Madureira, he was replaced by Richarlison at half-time after suffering an ankle injury; it was later revealed that he would be out for two months. In the meantime, he further extended his contract until 2020.

In 2017, Scarpa went to court to request that his contract with Fluminense be cancelled for delayed payments on Fluminense's part. After a protracted, public battle, the court ruled with Scarpa, and his contract with Fluminense was deemed null and void on 11 January 2018.

Palmeiras

Four days after the cancelation of his contract with Fluminense, Gustavo Scarpa signed a five-year contract with Palmeiras on 15 January 2018. He enjoyed great success with the Verdão, with more than 200 appearances and eight trophies over four years, including two leagues, the Copa do Brasil, and two Libertadores titles. 

On 10 July 2022, TNT Sports Brazil reported that Scarpa had signed a pre-contract for three-and-a-half years with Nottingham Forest on a free transfer, linking up with the recently promoted English club in January 2023.

Nottingham Forest
On 4 December 2022, it was officially announced that Scarpa would join Nottingham Forest on 1 January 2023 on a deal until June 2026. Scarpa made his Premier League debut for Forest on 4 January, coming on as a substitute in a 0-1 win against Southampton.

International career
On 19 January 2017, Scarpa was called up by Tite for a friendly against Colombia. He made his full international debut six days later, replacing Lucas Lima in the 1–0 win at the Engenhão.

Personal life 
Scarpa is well-known for his hobbies, including skateboarding, rock music, Rubik's cubes, wakeboarding and reading novels, all of which have received extensive attention thanks to his posts on social media and goal celebrations. Among his favourite pre-game songs are Dire Straits's "Sultans of Swing" and Lynyrd Skynyrd's "Free Bird," and his favourite books include Franz Kafka's The Metamorphosis and Fyodor Dostoevsky's Crime and Punishment and The Brothers Karamazov. In 2018, Palmeiras posted a video on social media of Scarpa playing the club's anthem on electric guitar to celebrate World Rock Day. In 2022, after Scarpa's love of Rubik's cubes went viral on social media, Palmeiras began to sell personalised Rubik's cubes in their club shop in his honour.

In March 2023, it was reported that Scarpa had lost a million pounds in a cryptocurrency scam and returned to Brazil before the end of the Premier League season in order to try to recover the funds.

Career statistics

Club

International

Honours
Fluminense
 Primeira Liga: 2016

Palmeiras
Campeonato Brasileiro Série A: 2018, 2022
Campeonato Paulista: 2020, 2022
Copa Libertadores: 2020, 2021
Copa do Brasil: 2020
Recopa Sudamericana: 2022
Individual
 Primeira Liga Best Player: 2016
 Campeonato Carioca Best Player: 2016
 Campeonato Carioca Team of the Year: 2016
 Campeonato Brasileiro Série A top assist provider: 2016 (10 assists), 2021 (13 assists) and 2022 (12 assists)
 Campeonato Brasileiro Série A Player of the Month: June 2022, June 2022, October 2022
 Copa Libertadores Team of the Tournament: 2019, 2022
 Bola de Ouro: 2022
 Craque do Brasileirão: 2022
 Bola de Prata: 2022
 Campeonato Brasileiro Série A Team of the Year: 2022
 South American Team of the Year: 2022

References

External links
Profile at the Nottingham Forest F.C. website

1994 births
Living people
Sportspeople from Campinas
Brazilian footballers
Association football midfielders
Campeonato Brasileiro Série A players
Fluminense FC players
Sociedade Esportiva Palmeiras players
Red Bull Brasil players
Copa Libertadores-winning players
Brazil international footballers
Nottingham Forest F.C. players
Premier League players
Brazilian expatriate footballers
Brazilian expatriate sportspeople in England
Expatriate footballers in England